Davča is a scattered settlement in the Municipality of Železniki in the Upper Carniola region of Slovenia. Davščica Creek flows past the settlement. The Cerkno Ski Resort is partially located in the settlement.

Name
The settlement may have been attested in written sources in 1345 as de Dauonça, but reliably in 1500 and 1515 as in der Allss. The initial d- in the name is derived either from the Romance preposition ad 'at' or the German article d(ie), making the name related to place names such as Avče and probably related to the Friulian hydronym Auzza or Aussa, which is of pre-Romance origin. It may ultimately be derived from Celtic *alika 'wild service tree' or *alisa 'alder'. See Dragonja for a similar name with a fused initial d-.

References

External links 
Davča at Geopedia

Populated places in the Municipality of Železniki